The Alphabet Game is a comedy panel game show that aired on BBC1 from 5 August 1996 to 27 March 1997 and is hosted by Andrew O'Connor. The programme was created by O'Connor, Rebecca Thornhill, Mark Maxwell-Smith and produced by Objective Productions. It was remade in Spain as Pasapalabra, for which ITV Studios sued Telecinco for €17,000,000; ITV would later remake the show as Alphabetical.

Format
Two members of the public team up with two celebrities each, while a fifth acts as judge. The five celebrities are there all week, while the contestants rotate. Round 1 sees the teams trying to buzz in for control of a question such as 'things I would do if I won the lottery'; the teams must then go through the alphabet to provide answers. The other team can challenge an answer if they feel it is incorrect, in which case the judge decides which team is correct. If the judge decides the challenging team is correct or a team member can't think of an answer, play passes to the other team. This round ends when one team passes Z, and the next consists of the teams trying to create a chain of words each starting with the end of the last. In round three, the teams are given a sentence and asked to finish it, for example "Kevin likes to F". The three members of the other team have a card each with one answer on which the opposing team must give. Each team member gets seven seconds each.

In round four, contestants must try and describe something using word/phrases beginning with each letter. Round five is a repeat of round one to be played until time is up. Round six is played by the winner; if the ties are scored, the teams decide amongst themselves to find one to win the prize for both teams. O'Connor will then ask a question with a three word answer, for example "Who invented the telephone?" and the three team members must answer "A G B" (Alexander Graham Bell). Five correct answers in sixty seconds nets them the prize.

Transmissions

International versions 
The format has been adapted in France, Spain, Colombia, Argentina, Panama, Portugal, Brasil, Italy, Turkey, Chile, Uruguay and Germany.

References

External links

1996 British television series debuts
1997 British television series endings
BBC panel games
British panel games
1990s British game shows
English-language television shows
Television series by All3Media